Mervyn Wilfred Susser (26 September 1921 – 14 August 2014) was a South African activist, doctor and epidemiologist.

His career was closely interwoven with that of his wife, Zena Stein. He is considered as one of the pioneers of epidemiology in the twentieth century.

Biography
Mervyn Wilfred Susser was born on 26 September 1921 in Johannesburg, South Africa to Solomon and Ida Rose (née Son) Susser. His family moved to Mokopane in Limpopo Province, where he learned to track game in the wild. His mother committed suicide when he was a young boy. His parents enrolled him in a Catholic girls' school because it was the best education available before later switching to an unspecified boys' school several hundred miles away.

Susser married Zena Stein in 1949. Susser and Stein had three children: Ezra Susser, Ruth Susser and Ida Susser.

Susser, Stein and colleagues began their careers at a clinic in Alexandra Township, where they developed ties with members of the anti-Apartheid Movement including Joe Slovo, Ahmed Kathrada, Walter Sisulu and Nelson Mandela.

In this work they were influenced and mentored by Sidney Kark. In 1955, Susser and Stein left South Africa for political reasons, taking positions at Manchester University. While there the couple published a paper on the epidemiology of peptic ulcers and Susser coauthored an early textbook on Medical Sociology, among other contributions.

In 1965, Susser and Stein moved to Columbia University to lead the Division of Epidemiology. Ideas from a series of lectures given at Columbia were published in the book Causal Thinking in the Health Sciences. At Columbia, Susser founded the Gertrude H. Sergievsky Center, where he was named a chair.

Towards the end of their careers, Susser and Stein became increasingly concerned about the HIV epidemic both in New York and in South Africa. They helped to organise a conference in Maputo in April 1990, which aimed to alert the African National Congress about the HIV epidemic in South Africa, sadly with limited effect. Susser, Stein and colleagues, worked on building scientific capacity in Southern Africa to deal with the HIV epidemic and Susser and Stein served as early directors at the Africa Centre for Health and Population Studies, a research centre in Northern KwaZulu-Natal.

He died on 14 August 2014 in Hastings-on-Hudson, New York.

Legacy
On learning of his death, aged 92, Section27 issued the following statement:

References

External links
 Giants Among Us: Mervyn Susser, a 2011 profile.
 Nigel Paneth (2003). A Conversation With Mervyn Susser, Columbia University

1921 births
2014 deaths
People from Johannesburg
South African Jews
South African public health doctors
South African expatriates in the United States
Columbia University faculty
Members of the National Academy of Medicine